Surrender is the ninth studio album by the Christian rock band Kutless. It was released by BEC Recordings on November 13, 2015. This album marks the return of long-time producer Aaron Sprinkle; the band's first record with him since Hearts of the Innocent in 2006. This is also the first album to feature bassist Neal Cameron and drummer Drew Porter, the latter of whom replaced previous drummer Kyle Peek.

History

On November 6, 2015 the song "Mirror" was released.

Critical reception

Signaling in a three and a half star review from CCM Magazine, Matt Conner recognizes, "the band stays true to form on Surrender". Jordan Gonzalez, indicating in a three star review by HM Magazine, responds, "Surrender isn't a bad album, but it's not impressive, either." Awarding the album four stars at New Release Today, Jonathan J. Francesco states, "Kutless is back! Maybe not quite better than ever, but with a strong and satisfying return to the sound that made them famous. Surrender is a success and should give those who missed a rocking Kutless the album they've spent the better part of a decade waiting for." Christopher Smith, giving the album three and a half stars for Jesus Freak Hideout, writes, "Kutless fans old and new will want to give Surrender a spin...It's not without its hiccups, but you might be surprised how much you'll like it." Rating the album a 4.7 out of five from The Christian Beat, Chris Major says, "Surrender is a powerful, impactful collection of praise and worship." Joshua Andre, indicating in a four star review at 365 Days of Inspiring Media, responds, "With hard rock, CCM, worship and pop/rock all working together in harmony; Surrender is sure to impact the lives of many, and surprise us all in a good way!" Allotting the album 4.6 stars from Today's Christian Entertainment, Jay Heilman replies, "Surrender is an album that new and old fans alike will enjoy for a long time to come." Sam Carothers, indicating in a 95 out of 100 review from Jesus Wired, writes, "Surrender is satisfying to fans new and old with its elements of edgy rock infused with straight-up contemporary worship."

Track listing

Personnel 
Kutless
 Jon Micah Sumrall – lead and backing vocals, piano
 James Mead – guitars
 Neal Cameron – bass guitar, backing vocals (photographed in the album booklet's liner notes, but does not perform on the album)
 Drew Porter – drums

Additional Musicians
Tracks #1, 3 & 5-10
 Jesse Sprinkle – drums
 Aaron Sprinkle – bass, keyboards, programming, percussion, additional guitars, additional vocals

Tracks #2 & 4
 Mike Payne – guitar
 Tony Lucido – bass
 Ben Phillips – drums

Production 
Tracks #1, 3 & 5-10
 Aaron Sprinkle – producer, engineer
 Lee Unfried – drum engineering at OMNISound, Nashville, Tennessee
 Josh Auer – mixing
 Troy Glessner – mastering for Spectre Mastering
 Jon Micah Sumrall – vocal and guitar engineering, additional production
 James Mead – vocal and guitar engineering, additional production
 Brian Moore – drum technician

Tracks #2 & 4
 Ian Eskelin – producer
 Barry Weeks – engineer
 Anthony Porcheddu – additional engineering and programming
 Ainslie Grosser – mixing

Additional Credits
 Conor Farley – A&R
 Chris Edmiston – management for West Coast Artist Management
 Nick de Partee – album design for Equal Seven Creative (equalseven.com)
 Eric Brown – photography for Eric Brown Photo (ericbrownphoto.com)

Chart performance

Awards and nominations
In 2016, 'Surrender' was nominated for a Dove Award for 'Best Rock/Contemporary Album of the Year'.

References

2015 albums
Kutless albums
BEC Recordings albums